Courage Investment Group Limited (short form: Courage Investment), founded in June 2001, is a Bermuda registered shipping company engaged in the ownership and operation of bulk carriers. It owns and operates eight bulk carriers, including five Handysize carriers between 25,000 and 50,000 deadweight tons (“dwt”) and three Panamax vessels of about 65,000 dwt. The total tonnage of these vessels is approximately 398,108 dwt.

The company provides marine transportation services and logistical support, carrying bulk commodities such as cement wood chips, coal, iron ore and minerals. The fleet operates mainly in Asian waters, including China, Taiwan and elsewhere in Asia.

Courage Investment launched an IPO on Singapore's SGX Mainboard in 2005. Moreover, the company has been rated one of the world’s top 10 public shipping companies by Marine Money International in terms of overall performance for third year in a row. In 2008, the company was also selected as one of the "Best Under A Billion" companies by Forbes Asia.

Fleet

See also
Shipping

References

External links 
 Official website
 Courage Marine Listed Company

Companies listed on the Singapore Exchange
Companies listed on the Hong Kong Stock Exchange
Transport companies established in 2001
Shipping companies of Hong Kong